Saeeda Mahmood is an Afghan broadcast journalist who worked for BBC World Service, Pashto Section for more than 25 years. 
Saeeda was born in Kandahar and brought up in the Helmand Province of Afghanistan. Saeeda’s was the first Afghan generation to think about a higher education within the country, rather than abroad in Beirut, or Delhi, or Istanbul.

References

Living people
Afghan women journalists
Afghan journalists
21st-century Afghan women writers
21st-century Afghan writers
Afghan emigrants to England
Year of birth missing (living people)